Orlin may refer to:

Orlin (given name), a given name, traditional Bulgarian male name
Orlin (surname), a surname
Orlin (Stargate), a character in the Stargate TV series
Orlin, a mount near Gacko, Bosnia and Herzegovina
Orlin Dywer / Cicada, a supervillain and the primary antagonist of The Flash's fifth season.

See also
Orlina, a settlement in Nikšić, Montenegro